Basilica churches, many of great architectural significance, can be found throughout France. There are 167 which have been officially designated as minor basilicas by the Catholic Church. They are listed below by region, along with the date of designation. Where no date is given, the church is considered a basilica from the architectural point of view and not from the ecclesiastical.

Alsace

Aquitaine

Auvergne

Burgundy

Brittany (Bretagne)

Centre

Champagne

Franche-Comté

Île-de-France (Paris region)

Languedoc-Roussillon

Lorraine

Midi-Pyrénées

Nord-Pas-de-Calais

Normandy

Pays de la Loire

Picardy

Poitou-Charentes

Provence

Rhône-Alpes

See also
 Basilica
 List of basilicas
 Portal:Christianity
 List of Roman Catholic basilicas

Sources and external links

List
GCatholic.org: Basilicas in France

Individual churches
Notre-Dame de Thierenbach, Jungholtz, Alsace
Notre-Dame-des-Miracles, Mauriac, Auvergne
Notre-Dame-des-Fers, Orcival, Auvergne
Saint-Julien, Brioude, Auvergne
Saint-Remi, Reims, Champagne
Notre-Dame, Gray, Franche-Comté
Saint Nazaire, Carcassonne, Languedoc-Roussillon
Saint Sernin, Toulouse, Midi-Pyrénées
Notre-Dame-de-la-Treille, Lille, Nord-Pas-de-Calais
Sainte-Trinité, Cherbourg, Normandy
Saint-Maximin, Var, Provence
Notre-Dame de Bon-Secours, Guingamp, Côtes d'Armor

 
Basilicas France
France